Lily Gladstone (born August 2, 1986) is an American actress.

Biography
Raised in Browning, Montana, Gladstone is of Blackfeet and Nimíipuu heritage and grew up on the reservation of the Blackfeet Nation. Gladstone is also a distant relative of British Prime Minister William Gladstone.

After graduating high school in the Seattle suburb of Mountlake Terrace she attended the University of Montana, graduating in 2008 with a B.F.A. in Acting/Directing and a minor in Native American Studies.

Her acting break came in 2016 when she was cast as The Rancher in Kelly Reichardt's feature film Certain Women, for which she won the Los Angeles Film Critics Association Award for Best Supporting Actress and the Boston Society of Film Critics Award for Best Supporting Actress. She also received nominations for the Independent Spirit Award for Best Supporting Female and Gotham Independent Film Award for Breakthrough Actor. She had a small role in Reichardt's 2019 film First Cow, before being cast as a lead in Martin Scorsese's feature film Killers of the Flower Moon.

Stage work
Gladstone was in the Oregon Shakespeare Festival acting company in 2017 and starred in the Yale Repertory Theater production of Mary Kathryn Nagle’s Manahatta in 2020.

Filmography

Film

Television

References

External links

Native American actresses
Blackfeet Nation people
1986 births
Living people
University of Montana alumni
People from Browning, Montana
People from Kalispell, Montana
21st-century American women
21st-century Native American women
21st-century Native Americans